Sports Night is an American television series about a fictional sports news show also called Sports Night. It focuses on the friendships, pitfalls and ethical issues the creative talent of the program face while trying to produce a good show under constant network pressure. Created by Aaron Sorkin, the half-hour prime time comedy drama aired on ABC for two seasons, from September 22, 1998 to May 16, 2000.

The show stars Robert Guillaume as managing editor Isaac Jaffe, Felicity Huffman as executive producer Dana Whitaker, Peter Krause as anchor Casey McCall, Josh Charles as anchor Dan Rydell, Sabrina Lloyd as senior associate producer Natalie Hurley, and Joshua Malina as associate producer Jeremy Goodwin. Regular guest stars included William H. Macy as ratings expert Sam Donovan and Brenda Strong as Sally Sasser, the producer of West Coast Update (a sister show on the same network as Sports Night) and professional and romantic rival of Dana. Other notable guest stars included Paula Marshall and several who later appeared on Sorkin's The West Wing including Janel Moloney, Teri Polo, Ted McGinley, Lisa Edelstein, Clark Gregg, Nina Siemaszko, John De Lancie, Timothy Davis-Reed, Cress Williams, Nadia Dajani, and Spencer Garrett.

TV Guide ranked it #10 on their 2013 list of 60 shows that were "Cancelled Too Soon".

Overview
The show is said to be a semi-fictional account of the ESPN SportsCenter team of Keith Olbermann and Dan Patrick, with Rydell representing Olbermann and McCall representing Patrick. Patrick has confirmed this on his syndicated radio program The Dan Patrick Show. It has also been said that many of the storylines for McCall were inspired by Craig Kilborn, who was an anchor on SportsCenter during the mid 1990s.

The fictional Sports Night is a sports news program in the style of SportsCenter. The show broadcasts live from 11 pm to midnight and is rebroadcast through the next morning; it may broadcast at other times for special events, such as the NFL Draft. The program debuted in 1996 and airs from Rockefeller Center in New York City on the fictional Continental Sports Channel (CSC), a unit of Continental Corp, owned and run by Luther Sachs. Continental Corp owns cable networks around the United States; when the company is offered for sale, bidders include Time Warner, Disney (which, incidentally, owns a majority of ESPN in reality), and News Corporation.

Both the fictional show and the network have competitive and financial difficulties. The network, according to Continental Corp's CFO, has an annual deficit up to $120 million. Although Sports Night does better than CNN/SI, Dana Whitaker says that Sports Night is "in third place. We are getting our asses kicked by ESPN and Fox". Natalie Hurley replies, "Every show on this network is in third place. It's a third-place network." When Sports Night is asked to interview Michael Jordan about his new perfume, the retired basketball star's publicity team demands final cut privilege—something it would not ask Fox or ESPN—because it believes that Sports Night is more desperate for ratings.

Although the first season of Sports Night is a sitcom, it often is portrayed as more of a comedy drama representative of some of Sorkin's later work on The West Wing. Sorkin intended for the series' humor to be drier and more realistic than typical sitcoms. He initially wanted the show to be recorded without a laugh track, but ABC network executives insisted on including one. The volume of the laugh track faded as Season One continued and was abandoned at the beginning of Season Two.

The dialogue is often delivered at a rapid-fire pace and intentionally exposes many aspects of communication that go beyond the words that are spoken. The show also frequently employed a technique known as "Walk and Talk", where the characters are walking from one location to the next while in conversation. This is another characteristic of Sorkin's shows as "walk and talks" are used quite frequently in The West Wing and Studio 60 on the Sunset Strip. A number of similar themes, elements and actors carried over from Sports Night to The West Wing and later Studio 60 on the Sunset Strip.

The show's main focus is the relationships between the characters. These include an off-again on-again flirtation and romance between Dana and Casey, the partnership of Natalie and Jeremy, and Dan's ongoing problems with relationships in general. The character of Isaac Jaffe hovers over his staff as a benevolent but uncompromising father figure.

The show is mostly set in the studio and station offices. However, in the second season Anthony's, a local sports bar and restaurant, was introduced as another location for scenes out of the work environment.

Guillaume suffered a stroke midway through the first season and this event was worked into his character and the season's story arc.

Sports Night struggled to find an audience and ABC cancelled it after two seasons. Although it had the opportunity to move to several different networks, including HBO, Showtime and USA, Sorkin decided to let the show pass so that he could focus on The West Wing.

Cast
Josh Charles – Daniel "Dan" Rydell, Co-Anchor. A graduate of Dartmouth College, he has known Casey for 10 years as of the show's first season and they have worked together for five years. Before Sports Night they co-hosted a sports show in Dallas.
Peter Krause – Casey McCall, Co-Anchor. He turned down an offer from NBC to replace David Letterman in 1993. Casey divorced Lisa, his college girlfriend, after 10 years of marriage just before the show's first season.
Felicity Huffman – Dana Whitaker, Executive Producer. She has been friends with Casey since college and there is romantic tension between the two of them.
Joshua Malina – Jeremy Goodwin, Associate Producer & Research Analyst who has an on-again off-again relationship with Natalie.
Sabrina Lloyd – Natalie Hurley, Senior Associate Producer who has an on-again off-again relationship with Jeremy.
Robert Guillaume – Isaac Jaffe, Managing Editor. A Pulitzer Prize-winning journalist who began with the Atlanta Journal and ended his career as London bureau chief for CNN. A lifelong sports fan who attended the Giants-Dodgers game that decided the 1951 National League pennant, he agreed to come out of retirement when Continental Corp began a sports cable channel.

Supporting cast
Kayla Blake – Kim, Associate Producer
Greg Baker – Elliott, Associate Producer
Jeff Mooring – Dave, Director
Ron Ostrow – Will, Technician
Timothy Davis-Reed – Chris, Technician
William H. Macy – Sam Donovan, CSC Ratings Advisor (season 2)
Teri Polo – Rebecca Wells, Market Analyst for Continental Corp.
Brenda Strong – Sally Sasser, Executive Producer of West Coast Update
Robert Mailhouse – J.J., Network Advisor
Ted McGinley – Gordon Gage (season 1)
Jayne Brook – Abby Jacobs (season 2)
Paula Marshall – Jenny (season 2)
Megan Ward – Pixley (season 2)
Clark Gregg – Calvin Trager (season 2)

Episodes
On November 5, 2002, Walt Disney Studios Home Entertainment released the entire series on DVD in Region 1 for the first time.

A special 10th Anniversary Edition Sports Night DVD set was released on September 30, 2008 from Shout! Factory with new bonus features including all-new interviews with creator Aaron Sorkin and cast & crew, featurettes and commentaries.  Also included is a commemorative 36-page booklet.

In March 2010, Shout! Factory released Sports Night: Season One on DVD with just 16 episodes.

Season 1: 1998–1999

Season 2: 1999–2000

Additional airings
After its cancellation, the rerun rights to the show were briefly picked up by Comedy Central.
In 2004, ABC1, a British offshoot of ABC, began broadcasting Season 1 of Sports Night in the United Kingdom for the first time. The second season aired in January 2006.
It was also aired briefly in Latin America on Sony Entertainment Television. The Spanish version of this channel ran the show in Spain.
Australia's Channel 7 aired the show on late night television from 1999 to 2001 and was later repeated in the mornings in 2002.
Australia's Foxtel cable network aired Sports Night on The Comedy Channel in 2005.
The show was aired in Turkey on DiziMax in 2006.
The show aired in Italy on Raidue (from 2006 to 2008) and Rai4 (July 2009).
The show was available on Netflix. The Netflix airings did not retain the entire original soundtrack.
Reruns of Sports Night aired semi-regularly on FXX from the network's inception in 2013 until 2015.
All episodes of the show previously were available on Hulu in the US.

Awards
 American Cinema Editors (ACE)
1999: Best Edited Half-Hour Series for Television (Janet Ashikaga for "Small Town", nominated)

 Art Directors Guild (ADG)
1998: Excellent Production Design – Television Series (Thomas Azzari, nominated)

 Casting Society of America (CSA)
1998: Best Casting – Comedy Episodic (nominated)
1998: Best Casting – Comedy Pilot (nominated)
1999: Best Casting – Comedy Episodic (nominated)

 Directors Guild of America (DGA)
1998: Outstanding Directorial Achievement – Comedy Series (Thomas Schlamme for "Pilot", won)
1999: Outstanding Directorial Achievement- Comedy Series (Schlamme for "Small Town", nominated)

 Emmy Awards
1999: Outstanding Directing for a Comedy Series (Thomas Schlamme for "Pilot", won)
1999: Outstanding Multi-Camera Picture Editing for a Series (for "Small Town", won)
1999: Outstanding Writing in a Comedy Series (Aaron Sorkin for "The Apology", nominated)
2000: Outstanding Cinematography for a Multi-Camera Series (for "Cut Man", won)
2000: Outstanding Casting for a Comedy Series (nominated)
2000: Outstanding Directing for a Comedy Series (Schlamme for "Quo Vadimus", nominated)
2000: Outstanding Guest Actor in a Comedy Series (William H. Macy for playing "Sam Donovan", nominated)
2000: Outstanding Multi-Camera Picture Editing for a Series (for "The Cut Man Cometh", nominated)

 Golden Globe Awards
1999: Best Actress – Musical or Comedy Series (Felicity Huffman for playing "Dana Whitaker", nominated)

 Humanitas Prize
1999: Television series – 30 minutes. won

 Image Awards
1998: Outstanding Actor – Comedy Series (Robert Guillaume for playing "Isaac Jaffe", nominated)
1999: Outstanding Actor – Comedy Series (Guillaume, nominated)
2000: Outstanding Actor – Comedy Series (Guillaume, nominated)

 Producers Guild of America (PGA)
1999: Television Producer of the Year Award in Episodic (nominated)

 Satellite Awards
2000: Best Actor – Musical or Comedy Series (Robert Guillaume for playing "Isaac Jaffe", nominated)

 Screen Actors Guild (SAG)
1999: Outstanding Cast – Comedy Series (nominated)

 Television Critics Association Awards (TCA)
1999: Program of the Year (nominated)
1999: Outstanding Achievement in Comedy (won)
1999: Outstanding New Program (nominated)

References

External links

 
 Episode Guide – TKTV
 First season interview with Aaron Sorkin
 

1990s American comedy-drama television series
1998 American television series debuts
2000 American television series endings
2000s American comedy-drama television series
American Broadcasting Company original programming
American sports television series
English-language television shows
Primetime Emmy Award-winning television series
Television series about show business
Television series about television
Television series by ABC Studios
Television series created by Aaron Sorkin
Television shows set in Manhattan
Television series by Imagine Entertainment